Sara Ashraf Mohamed Mohamed Baraka (born August 17, 1991, in Giza, Giza Governorate, Egypt) is an Egyptian Olympic rower. She represented Egypt in the 2012 Summer Olympics in London.  She and teammate Ingy Hassamel Din qualified to compete in the women's lightweight double sculls by winning the event at the African Olympic Qualifier.

Olympic participation

London 2012 
Rowing  – Women's lightweight double sculls

References 

1991 births
Egyptian female rowers
Olympic rowers of Egypt
Rowers at the 2012 Summer Olympics
Living people
Sportspeople from Giza
21st-century Egyptian women